General José Antonio Salcedo y Ramírez, known as "Pepillo" (1816–1864) was a 19th-century President of the Dominican Republic.

Biography 
Salcedo was born in Madrid, Spain from Criollo (white creole) parents of Spanish heritage who had been stationed in Spain for over a year, as part of the traditional Grand Tour of rich Latin American Criollos to Spain.

The names of his parents were José María Salcedo and Luisa Ramírez y Marichal, both Cuban-born Dominicans (many Dominicans fled the island due to the Napoleonic wars, the Haitian slave revolt and the political instability from 1795 to 1809: about 4,000 went to Cuba and 100,000 did so to Venezuela while scores exiled in Puerto Rico and Mexico; many Dominicans and their foreign-born children eventually returned to the island).

Leaving Spain, the family returned to Cuba when Salcedo was a year old before settling in the lands of their ancestors in the Cibao valley. He grew up near the border of Haiti where he managed large tracts of land, herds of livestock, and a rich timber business in the towns of Hatillo Palma, Estero Balsa, and Botoncillo in the northwest.

Salcedo led a civil war which aimed at the restoration of the Dominican Republic. The Dominican Restoration War began on August 16, 1863, and by September 14, 1863 a Provisional Government was established, over which the general presided. After he became the 1st head of state of the Dominican Republic, the general was opposed by the Nationalist movement, who viewed his policies as favoring those supporting the annexation of the country. On October 15, 1864, Head of State Salcedo sent word to his wife (who lived in Guayubín) with a young soldier who was nearly in his mid-twenties named Ulises Heureaux. After on the same day, he was assassinated by Coronel Agustín Masagó by the order of General Gaspar Polanco.

Salcedo married Águeda Rodríguez of Guayubín, Monte Cristi. Together they had at least four children: José Tomás (born 1841 and married Rosa Elvira Brea in 1869), Antonia (born 1846), Cristina (born 1851), and Julia (married Rosendo Batista in 1888) Salcedo y Rodríguez. Antonia Salcedo married and had a daughter with another Restoration figure, Dionisio Troncoso (1834–1891), named Antonia María Troncoso y Salcedo. A great granddaughter of Pepillo, Genoveva Cruz, was 95 in 2017.

The town of Pepillo Salcedo, in Monte Cristi province, was named in his honor.

References 

1816 births
1864 deaths
19th-century Dominican Republic politicians
Politicians from Madrid
Presidents of the Dominican Republic
People of the Dominican Restoration War
Military personnel from Madrid
Dominican Republic people of Spanish descent
Spanish expatriates in the Dominican Republic
Assassinated heads of state
White Dominicans